Water polo events were contested at the 1970 Summer Universiade in Turin, Italy.

References
 Universiade water polo medalists on HickokSports

1970 Summer Universiade
Universiade
1970
1970